Burao District is a district of the Togdheer region in central Somaliland. Its capital lies at Burao.

Overview
The district is home to some of the largest livestock markets, known in Somali as seylad, in the Horn of Africa, with as many as 10,000 heads of sheep and goats sold daily in the markets of Burao and Yirowe, many of whom shipped to Gulf states via the port of Berbera. The markets handle livestock from all over the Horn of Africa.

Major cities and towns 
Burco
War Cimraan 
Balidhiig
Yirowe
Beer
Dabaqabad
Jaamac Liibaan
Qoryaale
Odanleh
Qalloocan
Warta- Shacabi
Kirit

See also
Administrative divisions of Somaliland
Regions of Somaliland
Districts of Somaliland
Somalia–Somaliland border

References

External links
 Administrative map of Burao District

Districts of Somaliland
Togdheer